East View Geospatial (EVG), formerly East View Cartographic (EVC), is a provider of worldwide maps, geospatial data and geographic information systems (GIS) services. EVG's holdings include all types of geospatial data including vector & raster data, digital elevation models (DEM), satellite & aerial imagery, topographic maps, nautical & aeronautical charts, geological maps, bathymetric data and atlases.

EVG has a history serving Energy & Natural Resource, Avionics, and Telecom companies, Defense and Intelligence contractors, Land Use & Engineering firms, Humanitarian organizations and Academic institutions.

EVG is headquartered in Minneapolis, Minnesota, with offices in Russia, Kenya, China and Ukraine.

East View Geospatial Jottings

EVG has played a role in gaining access to and then marketing original geospatial information from China and Russia, pertaining in particular to Asia, South America, and Africa, areas of the world for which the United States of America does not have tactical maps at the 1:50,000 or better level, with contour lines.

In 2003, East View Cartographic formed a partnership with Environmental Systems Research Institute (ESRI) to provide data sets for ESRI's Mapshop web application.

In 2006, East View acquired perhaps the first comprehensive private collection of worldwide geologic maps from the Telberg Geologic Map Service.

In 2010, East View acquired the map assets and domain name of Map Link.

In 2012, East View Cartographic changed its name to East View Geospatial.

About East View

East View was founded in 1989 and is headquartered in Minneapolis, Minnesota, USA. East View is divided into East View Information Services (www.eastview.com), East View Geospatial and East View Map Link.

 East View Information Services (EVIS) is a provider of native and translated foreign language information databases, print periodicals, books and microforms.
 East View Geospatial (EVG) is a provider of worldwide maps, geospatial data and GIS production services and solutions.
East View Map Link (EVML) is a provider of travel, thematic and wall maps, road atlases, globes and geography education materials.

East View maintains thousands of supplier/publisher relationships throughout the world for maps and geospatial data and Russian, Arabic and Chinese-produced social and hard science content. East View manages a data center, library and warehouse in Minneapolis where it hosts and stores dozens of foreign language databases, maps and atlases and geospatial, Russian, Chinese and Arabic metadata records.

Sources

Map companies of the United States
Companies based in Minneapolis